is the second vessel of the s of the Japan Maritime Self-Defense Force (JMSDF).

Design
The hull design is generally based on the one of the Murasame class. However, as a part of weapons was changed, the internal structure has also been changed. And it was said that the large lattice mast was degrading its stealthiness in the Murasame class, so in this class, it was considered to change to two small masts, but it was not implemented.

Although its displacement become slightly increased, there is no change in its main engines, as it is not a big difference that has little effect on the performance of the ship.

Construction and career  
Ōnami was authorized under the Medium-term Defense Buildup Plan of 1996, and was built by Mitsubishi Heavy Industries shipyards in Nagasaki. She was laid down on 17 May 2000, launched on 20 September 2001. She was commissioned into service on 13 March 2003. and was initially assigned to the JMSDF Escort Flotilla 1 based at Yokosuka.

Ōnami, along with the destroyer   and supply ship Hamana were assigned to the Indian Ocean in November 2004 to provide assistance to the Japanese Iraq Reconstruction and Support Group. She returned to Japan in March 2005.

Ōnami participated in the Malabar 2007 joint naval exercises in the Bay of Bengal in September 2007 together with the destroyer . In July 2009, she participated in joint naval exercises in the Sea of Japan together with a number of warships from the Republic of Korea Navy.

In January 2010, Ōnami, along with Sawagiri, was dispatched to Aden, Yemen to participate in anti-piracy escort operations off the coast of Somalia.  Approximately 2,000 merchant ships with ties to Japan, Japan-flagged or operated by Japanese firms pass through the busy shipping zone each year. The destroyer was part of the fourth rotation of JMSDF vessels patrolling in this region. She undertook 32 sorties, escorting 283 commercial vessels, and returned to Japan on 2 July 2010.

This ship was one of several in the JMSDF fleet participating in disaster relief after the 2011 Tōhoku earthquake and tsunami.

On 11 October 2011 she was dispatched to Aden again, together with her sister ship , to resume anti-piracy escort operations off the coast of Somalia. The context for this extended deployment off the Horn of Africa was the "Law on the Penalization of Acts of Piracy and Measures Against Acts of Piracy (Anti-Piracy Measures Law)".   She returned to Yokosuka on 12 March 2012

On 9 June 2012, Ōnami participated in JIMEX 12, the first naval exercise between the JMSDF and the Indian Navy, held in Sagami Bay, which commemorated 60 years of diplomatic relations between India and Japan.

Notes

References

 
Saunders, Stephen. IHS Jane's Fighting Ships 2013-2014. Jane's Information Group (2003). 

2001 ships
Takanami-class destroyers
Onami (DD-111)